Typha valentinii is a plant species native to Republic of Azerbaijan between Russia and Iran. The species grows in freshwater marshes.

References

valentinii
Freshwater plants
Flora of Azerbaijan
Flora of Iran
Flora of Russia
Plants described in 2000